The Gesundheit Radio was an art project exhibited in MOMA, the "back-story" of the piece was reported in the press without clear indication that the work was an art exhibit and back-story complete fiction.

Artwork with fictional technological history
The playfully imagined "radio", exhibited at MOMA by artist James Chambers, but according to Chambers' backstory first seen in 1972, was engineered to sneeze, blowing out dust and shaking its case. In the backstory, the radio did this routinely once every six months. The Radio was supposedly created by an experimental research group at Texas Instruments. The exclamation "Gesundheit!" ("Health!", i.e. "Bless you!") is the German response to someone who has sneezed.

In the artwork's fictional history, it was however not German, but had been designed by the "Attenborough Design Group", supposed to have been active in the 1970s and 1980s, and an experimental section within Texas Instruments, where it was their first product. Other whimsical artworks with technological inspiration supposed to have been created by the group included the AntiTouch Lamp which avoided human touch, allegedly to protect its halogen lamp.

In the fiction, twice a year, the radio's case would lean back and use internal bellows to blow out the accumulated dust, supposedly to protect early microprocessors from dust and ensure a longer life for the device. The artists suggest that this feature is at odds with the built-in obsolescence of many modern gadgets.

Continuing the fiction, the radio's users supposedly had the option of overriding the bi-annual sneeze manually, with a SNZ button (not a clock radio's "Snooze" function) to activate the sneeze.

In the fictional history, the experimental research group within Texas Instruments was said to have examined how behaviors in nature could be applied to design; in this case, the ability to sneeze. It was said to be investigating the potential of other animal actions to be used as defense for a 'family' of between 3 and 5 products, and re-interpreting the standing hard drive (an earlier artwork) as a portable floppy disk drive so as to fit in with the Attenborough Design Group's fictional timeline. The whimsical device's legs popped up when coffee was spilt on the table under it, keeping it out of harm's way.

The video on Vimeo shows the radio sneezing, visibly expelling dust through its front. It was exhibited at the Royal College of Art while Chambers was studying there.

Reception
Chris Davies, writing on SlashGear, commented that personal computers could do with something like Chambers' Gesundheit Radio's bellows to keep them free of dust, given by how much dust they habitually collect.

Jaymi Heimbuch, writing on Treehugger, wrote that keeping dust out of gadgets prolonged their lives, and that while getting an iPad to sneeze like the Gesundheit Radio might not be a good idea, cleaning electronics devices certainly is.

References

History of radio
2010 sculptures
Installation art works